Ilmoilanselkä is a lake in Finland. It is part of a chain of lakes that begins from the lakes Lummene and Vesijako at the drainage divide between the Kokemäenjoki and Kymijoki basins, flows westwards from there through the lakes Kuohijärvi, Kukkia, Iso-Roine, Hauhonselkä and Ilmoilanselkä and drains into lake Mallasvesi. The lake is part of the Kokemäenjoki basin and is located for the biggest part in the area of the city of Hämeenlinna (in the area of the former municipality of Hauho) in the Tavastia Proper region and for a smaller part in the municipality of Pälkäne in the Pirkanmaa region.

See also
List of lakes in Finland

References

Kokemäenjoki basin
Hämeenlinna
Landforms of Kanta-Häme
Lakes of Pälkäne